Rodney Gordon (18 December 1923 – 7 March 1990) is a South African cricketer. He played in one first-class match for Border in 1939/40.

See also
 List of Border representative cricketers

References

External links
 

1923 births
1990 deaths
South African cricketers
Border cricketers
Sportspeople from Qonce